The Union of Independents of Ivory Coast (UICI) was a splinter group of the Democratic Party of Ivory Coast (PDCI). UICI was founded in Bouaké in the end of 1949. It was led by N'Dia Koffi Blaise and Mansilla Leopold. At the beginning of 1950 UICI merged into the Entente of Independents of Ivory Coast.

Sources
Gbagbo, Laurent: Côte d'Ivoire, Pour une alternative démocratique. Paris: L'Harmattan, 1983.

Defunct political parties in Ivory Coast
Political parties in French West Africa
1949 establishments in French West Africa
Political parties established in 1949
Political parties disestablished in 1950